Nedim Remili (born 18 July 1995) is a French handball player for Telekom Veszprém and the France national team.

Biography
Remili was born in Créteil, a commune in southeastern suburbs of Paris. His father, Kamel Remili, played his entire career for US Créteil and won the LNH 1 with them in 1989. His brother Meyane played for SO Romorantin and US Créteil-Lusitanos.

When Nedim turned 10, he began playing handball in his fathers club, US Créteil, where his father works as a board member. Remili showed a lot of qualities while in the academy of US Créteil and reached a height of 1.95 meter at the age of 16. Remili made his debut for the first team of US Créteil on 12 October 2012, at the age of 17, during a league game against USDK Dunkerque. During the same year, Créteil were relegated to the Handball D2, the second-tier league of France. Despite interest from some of the biggest clubs in French handball, Remili signed his first professional contract in 2013 with US Créteil.

The following season (2013–14), in the Handball D2, Remili became a key player in the squad of US Créteil, and helped them to return to the LNH 1. Remili was called up to the national France youth team for the 2015 Men's Junior World Championship, but a shoulder injury forced him to watch the championship at home, as France became world champions.

During the 2015–16 season, Remili performed amazingly for US Créteil, which earned him a call-up to the All-Star Game and to the France national team for the 2016 European Championship.

Individual awards 
All-Star Right back of the World Championship: 2017
All-Star Centre back of the World Championship: 2023
All-Star Centre back of the Olympic games: 2020

References

External links

1995 births
Living people
French male handball players
French sportspeople of Algerian descent
Sportspeople from Créteil
Handball players at the 2020 Summer Olympics
Medalists at the 2020 Summer Olympics
Olympic gold medalists for France
Olympic medalists in handball
Expatriate handball players
French expatriate sportspeople in Poland
French expatriate sportspeople in Hungary
Vive Kielce players
Veszprém KC players